Naked Sun is a 1958 Japanese drama film directed by Miyoji Ieki. It was entered into the 9th Berlin International Film Festival.

Cast
 Shinjirō Ehara
 Michiko Hoshi
 Tatsuya Nakadai as Jirō Maeda
 Hitomi Nakahara
 Satomi Oka
 Toshio Takahara as  Kenzō Sakiyama
 Junikichi Orimoto as takeshi Kimura

References

External links

1958 films
1958 drama films
Japanese drama films
1950s Japanese-language films
Japanese black-and-white films
1950s Japanese films